Vanmanenia is a genus of loaches from China and mainland Southeast Asia.

Species
There are currently 17 species recognized in this genus:
 Vanmanenia caldwelli Nichols, 1925
 Vanmanenia caobangensis V. H. Nguyễn, 2005
 Vanmanenia crassicauda Kottelat, 2000
 Vanmanenia gymnetrus Yi-Yu Chen, 1980
 Vanmanenia hainanensis Yi-Yu Chen & C. Y. Zheng, 1980
 Vanmanenia homalocephala C. G. Zhang & Y. H. Zhao, 2000
 Vanmanenia lineata P. W. Fang, 1935
 Vanmanenia maculata W. J. Yi, E. Zhang & J. Z. Shen, 2014 
 Vanmanenia multiloba Đ. Y. Mai, 1978 (the validity and placement of this species in this genus is uncertain)
 Vanmanenia nahangensis V. H. Nguyễn, 2005 (the validity and placement of this species in this genus is uncertain)
 Vanmanenia pingchowensis P. W. Fang, 1935
 Vanmanenia serrilineata Kottelat, 2000
 Vanmanenia stenosoma Boulenger, 1901
 Vanmanenia striata Yi-Yu Chen, 1980
 Vanmanenia tetraloba Đ. Y. Mai, 1978 (the validity and placement of this species in this genus is uncertain)
 Vanmanenia ventrosquamata Đ. Y. Mai, 1978 (the validity and placement of this species in this genus is uncertain)
 Vanmanenia xinyiensis C. Y. Zheng & Yi-Yu Chen, 1980

Questionable species
There are three species of questionable validity that FishBase recognizes but that Kottelat and the California Academy of Sciences' Catalog of Fishes (following Kottelat) consider probable junior synonyms:
 Vanmanenia microlepis V. H. Nguyễn, 2005 (jr. synonym of Vanmanenia crassicauda)
 Vanmanenia monofasciodorsala V. H. Nguyễn, 2005 (jr. synonym of Vanmanenia serrilineata)
 Vanmanenia trifasciodorsalata V. H. Nguyễn, 2005 (jr. synonym of Vanmanenia serrilineata)

References

Gastromyzontidae
Freshwater fish of Asia
Freshwater fish of China
Freshwater fish genera